Harold Green (19 January 1860 – May 1900) was an English footballer who played at both right and left full-back.

Career 
Green was born in West Bromwich. He played for George Salter's Works before joining West Bromwich Albion. He played in three successive FA Cup Finals for Albion, picking up runners-up medals in 1886 and 1887 and a winners medal in 1888 when Preston North End were defeated 2–1.

He made his league debut on 8 September 1888, at full-back for West Bromwich Albion in a 2–0 win against Stoke at the Victoria Ground, Stoke. He played nine of the "Throstles" 22 Football League matches and was part of a defence-line that achieved three clean-sheets whilst restricting the opposition to a single goal on one occasion.

Harry Green was described as an excellent full-back, meaningful, sure-footed and one of the best of his era.

In 1891 Green left Albion to join Old Hill Wanderers. He died in West Bromwich in May 1900 **

** According to 'The Sporting Life' dated 22/11/1900 (and reported elsewhere ) he died of gout on 18/11/1900 leaving a widow and 5 children .

References 

 

1860 births
1900 deaths
Sportspeople from West Bromwich
English footballers
West Bromwich Albion F.C. players
Association football fullbacks
FA Cup Final players